Sellæg is a Norwegian surname. Notable people with the surname include:

 Sissel Sellæg (1928–2014), Norwegian actress
 Wenche Frogn Sellæg (born 1937), Norwegian politician

Norwegian-language surnames